The John R. Wooden Award is an award given annually to the most outstanding men's and women's college basketball players. The program consists of the men's and women's  Player of the Year awards, the Legends of Coaching award, and recognizing the All–America Teams.

The awards, given by the Los Angeles Athletic Club, are named in honor of John Wooden, the 1932 national collegiate basketball player of the year from Purdue. Wooden later taught and coached men's basketball at Indiana State and UCLA. Coach Wooden, whose teams at UCLA won ten NCAA championships, was the first man to be inducted into the Naismith Memorial Basketball Hall of Fame as a player and coach. His 1948 Indiana State team was the NAIB (now NAIA) National Finalist.

The award, which was originally given only to male athletes, was first given in 1977. Starting in 2004, the award was extended to women's basketball. Additionally, the Legends of Coaching Award was presented first in 1999.

Selection process

Men's award
Each year, the Award's National Advisory Board, a 26-member panel, selects approximately 20 candidates for Player of the Year and All-American Team honors. The candidates must be full-time students and have a cumulative grade point average of 2.00 or higher throughout their college career. Players who are nominated must have made outstanding contributions to team play, both offensively and defensively, and be model citizens, exhibiting strength of character both on and off the court.

The selection ballot is announced prior to the NCAA basketball tournament. The voters consist of 1,000 sportswriters and sportscasters representing the 50 states.

The top ten vote-getters are selected to the All-American Team, and the results are announced following the Elite Eight round of the NCAA Tournament. The person who receives the most votes is named the Player of the Year, and the winner is announced following the NCAA championship game.

The Player of the Year is awarded a trophy consisting of five bronze figures. The player's school receives a duplicate trophy as well as a scholarship grant. The other top four members of the All-American Team receive an All-American Team trophy, a jacket, and a scholarship grant which goes to their school. Each coach of the top five All-American Team members also receives a jacket. The All-American Team members ranked six through ten receive an All-American Team trophy and a jacket, but their schools do not receive a scholarship.

Women's award
The criteria for the women's Player of the Year award and All-American Team honors are similar to those for the men. For the women's award, the National Advisory Board consists of 12 members, and approximately 15 candidates are selected for the ballot. The voters are 250 sportswriters and sportscasters.

In contrast to the men's All-American Team, only five members are selected for the women's team. The Player of the Year receives a trophy, and her school receives a duplicate trophy and a scholarship grant.

The trophy

The trophy features five bronze figures, each depicting one of the five major skills that Wooden believed that "total" basketball player must exhibit: rebounding, passing, shooting, dribbling, and defense.

The concept for the trophy originated with Wooden Award Chairman, Richard "Duke" Llewellyn. Work began on the trophy in 1975, and sculptor Don Winton, who had sculpted many top sports awards, was given the task of designing the model of the trophy.

The figures are bronze plated and attached to a pentagonal base plate. The tallest figure is 10 inches high (26 cm). The trophy's base is 7 inches high (19 cm), and is made from solid walnut.

Wooden Award winners

Trademark dispute
The Wooden family announced in August 2005 that he would no longer participate because of a trademark dispute concerning the use of his name. However, he never contested the use of his name prior to his death in 2010, and the award continues to bear his name.  “I don’t want anything to interfere with the continuation of the award,” (Wooden) told The Associated Press at the time.
In 2011 the Wooden Family began participation. Coach John Wooden's son, Jim, presented the Wooden Award to Brigham Young senior Jimmer Fredette.  In 2012 John Wooden's grandson, Greg, on behalf of The Los Angeles Athletic Club, presented the Wooden Award to University of Kentucky freshman Anthony Davis. Greg Wooden made the announcement on ESPN College GameDay.

High School Player of the Year Award
The John R. Wooden High School Player of the Year awards are given to the most valuable player in each of the five divisions of the California Interscholastic Federation Southern Section, and one Los Angeles City division.

Legends of Coaching Award
The Legends of Coaching Award recognizes the lifetime achievement of coaches who exemplify Coach Wooden's high standards of coaching success and personal achievement. When selecting the individual, the Wooden Award Committee considers a coach's character, success rate on the court, graduating rate of student athletes, his or her coaching philosophy, and identification with the goals of the John R. Wooden Award.

All listed honorees coached in the men's game unless otherwise noted. The first recipient who was never a head coach in NCAA Division I was 2021 recipient Dave Yanai, whose entire head coaching career was in NCAA Division II.

See also
 List of U.S. men's college basketball national player of the year awards
 John R. Wooden Classic

References

External links
 

College basketball player of the year awards in the United States
Awards established in 1977